Dulhan Ganga Paar Ke is a 2018 Indian Bhojpuri-language action drama film directed by Aslam Sheikh and produced by Arvind Anand. The film stars Khesari Lal Yadav as Krishna and Kajal Raghwani as Radha, with Awdhesh Mishra, KK Goswami, Dev Singh, Prakash Jais, Shakeela Majeed, Deepak Sinha, and Brijesh Tripathi in supporting roles. The film was Kriti Yadav's debut as a child actress. Actress Amrapali Dubey made a special appearance in the song "Marad Abhi Baccha Ba".

Cast
Khesari Lal Yadav as Krishna
Kajal Raghwani as Radha
KK Goswami as Chota Saajan
Awadhesh Mishra as MLA's son
Kriti Yadav as Kriti
Shakeela Majeed as Krishna's mother
Deepak S as Krishna's father
Prakash Jais as Chota Saajan's friend
Dev Singh as MLA's brother in law
Brijesh Tripathi as MLA
Amrapali Dubey as item girl Marad Abhi Baccha Ba

Production
Most scenes were shot at Chanod and Halol in Gujarat, with some scenes also shot in Green Park, Amandi House, Bhullar Garden, Nandan Van, and China Creek in Mumbai.

The cinematography was done by Thamban K; the choreography was done by Kanu Mukerjee, Pappu Khanna, and Rikki Gupta; the visual effects were done by SP Mohit Kumar; the art direction was done by Anjani Tiwari and Ajay Maurya; the editor was Preetam Naik; the action director was Dileep Yadav; the wardrobe was designed by Badshah Khan; and the post-production was done by Audio Lab (Satish Pujari) and Heena Kanojiya.

Release
The film was released on 25 May 2018 in the major areas of Bihar, Jharkhand, and Nepal. The film premiered in around 110 plus theaters and received a huge opening at the box office. The film was originally scheduled to release on 11 May, but the makers of the film later pushed the release date back to 25 May.

On 10 August 2018, the film was released in theatres in Mumbai and Gujarat.

Soundtrack
The music for Dulhan Ganga Paar Ke was composed by Madhukar Anand with lyrics penned by Pyare Lal Yadav, Azad Singh, and Pawan Pandey, and with background music scored by Manoj Singh. The soundtrack was released by the film company Yashi Films, and consists of 8 songs. The full album was recorded by Khesari Lal Yadav, Priyanka Singh, Honey B, Sarodi Bohra and Arya Nandini.

The song "Marad Abhi Bacha", sung by Khesari Lal Yadav and Priyanka Singh, was uploaded to YouTube on 3 September 2018 and has more than 200 million views as of now. Another song from the film, "Dhukur Dhukur", was uploaded to YouTube on 15 September 2018 and has more than 70 million views as of now.

Marketing
The trailer for Dulhan Ganga Paar Ke was released on 23 April 2018 on the official YouTube handle of Yashi Films and has 3.4 million views as of now.

The full film was uploaded to YouTube on 10 October 2018. The video has over 80 million views as of now.

Award and nominations

References

2018 films
2010s Bhojpuri-language films